Chiang Saen Lake is a natural freshwater lake in Thailand, it is located in Yonok Subdistrict, Chiang Saen District, Chiang Rai Province, northernmost Thailand.

According to the folklore, the legend of Singhanavati (ตำนานสิงหนวัติ), it used to be an ancient kingdom known as Singhanavati or Yonok. The kingdom was destroyed by a sudden flood from earthquake in one night. Submerged the entire town in a what is known today as "Wiang Nong Lom" (เวียงหนองหล่ม, "drowned town") an archaeological swamp south of the lake.

This lake has a total area of 2,711 rais (1,071 acres). It was originally just a small swamp, until a dam was built to block the waterway overflow until a large lake was formed known as Nong Bong Kai (หนองบงคาย). On April 4, 1985, it was declared as Nong Bong Kai Non-hunting Area.

The lake is home to large flocks of migratory waterfowls which are most plentiful and can be seen at their best from November through February. Bird species found here are lesser whistling duck, grebe, common pochard, watercock etc.

There is a campsite for visitors. Chiang Saen Lake is regarded as the northernmost lake in Thailand.

See also
Singhanavati
List of protected areas of Thailand
List of Ramsar wetlands of Thailand

References

Lakes of Thailand
Ramsar sites in Thailand
Geography of Chiang Rai province
Tourist attractions in Chiang Rai province
 Non-hunting areas of Thailand